The Communauté de communes de l'Yerres à l'Ancœur is a former communauté de communes in the Seine-et-Marne département and in the Île-de-France région of France. It was created in November 2005. It was dissolved in January 2017.

Composition 
The Communauté de communes comprised the following communes:

 Aubepierre-Ozouer-le-Repos
 Bombon
 Bréau
 La Chapelle-Gauthier
 Chaumes-en-Brie
 Courtomer
 Guignes
 Mormant
 Saint-Méry

References 

Former commune communities of Seine-et-Marne